The Doig Medal is the best and fairest award given out to the player considered best and fairest during a season for the Fremantle Football Club in the AFL.

It was renamed in 2000 after the legendary Fremantle footballing family, the Doigs, who have had over 17 members play league football for East Fremantle or South Fremantle in the WAFL.  The most famous is George Doig who has been inducted in the Australian Football Hall of Fame.

Eight different players won the award between 1995 and 2002 until Peter Bell won his second medal in 2003. Following Bell's third medal in 2004, Matthew Pavlich won four consecutive medals to hold the record of six medals in total. Nat Fyfe became the third player to win multiple Doig medals when he won consecutive medals in 2013 and 2014.

The voting system as of the 2017 AFL season, consists of five coaches giving each player a ranking from zero to five after each match. Players can receive a maximum of 25 votes for a game.

Recipients

Multiple winners

See also
Fremantle fairest and best (AFL Women's)

References
General

Specific

Australian Football League awards
Fremantle Football Club
Awards established in 1995
Australian rules football-related lists